HMS Pathfinder was a P-class destroyer built for the Royal Navy during the Second World War. She was damaged while serving in the Far East, and was scrapped after the end of the war.

Description
The P-class destroyers were repeats of the preceding O class, except that they were armed with 4-inch (102 mm) anti-aircraft guns. They were powered by two Parsons geared steam turbines, each driving one propeller shaft, using steam provided by two Admiralty three-drum boilers. The ships' complement was 176 officers and men.

Pathfinder was armed with four QF 4-inch Mark V guns in single mounts, two pairs [superfiring] fore and aft. Her light anti-aircraft suite was composed of one quadruple mount for 2-pounder "pom-pom" guns and four single Oerlikon 20 mm cannon. The ship was fitted with two above-water quadruple mount for  torpedoes. The ship was fitted with four depth charge throwers and two racks for 70 depth charges.

Construction and career
The ship was built by Hawthorn Leslie & Co, and was launched on 10 April 1941, and commissioned in April 1942. During the war, Pathfinder was active in a number of theatres, and helped to sink several enemy submarines.

On 11 February 1945, Pathfinder was hit by an Imperial Japanese army fighter-bomber Ki-43 off Ramree, and was taken out of service. She sailed back to the UK using her starboard engine. On arrival at Devonport she was placed in reserve. She was then sold to the ship breakers Howells and scrapped in November 1948 at Milford Haven.

Notes

References

External links 
uboat.net on HMS "Pathfinder"

 

O and P-class destroyers
World War II destroyers of the United Kingdom
Ships built on the River Tyne
1941 ships
Maritime incidents in February 1945